Indian Lake State Park can refer to either of two state parks in the United States:

Indian Lake State Park (Michigan)
Indian Lake State Park (Ohio)